Gatewood Township is an inactive township in Ripley County, in the U.S. state of Missouri.

Gatewood Township was erected in 1882, taking its name from the community of Gatewood, Missouri.

References

Townships in Missouri
Townships in Ripley County, Missouri